Barbara Cunningham (28 July 1926 – 23 August 2022) was an Australian gymnast. She competed in five events at the 1956 Summer Olympics.

Cunningham died in Melbourne on 23 August 2022, at the age of 96.

References

1926 births
2022 deaths
Australian female artistic gymnasts
Olympic gymnasts of Australia
Gymnasts at the 1956 Summer Olympics
Sportspeople from Adelaide
20th-century Australian women